Ralph Winston Fox (30 March 1900 – 28 December 1936) was a British revolutionary, journalist, novelist, and historian, best remembered as a biographer of Lenin and Genghis Khan. Fox was one of the best-known members of the Communist Party of Great Britain (CPGB) to be killed in Spain fighting against the Nationalists in the Spanish Civil War.

Biography

Early years
Fox was born 30 March 1900 in Halifax, Yorkshire, England to a middle-class family. He knew James Crowther in his youth and helped stimulate Crowther's interest in marxism. Fox studied modern languages at Oxford University's Magdalen College, where he was drafted into Oxford University Officers’ Training Corps. Although commissioned as a lieutenant, the war ended before Fox was sent to the front lines of World War I. During his time in Oxford, Fox joined the Oxford University Labour Club, where he met activist fellow activist Tom Wintringham.

In 1919 Fox became active in the effort to halt British blockade and military intervention to overthrow the Bolshevik government which had assumed power in the Russian Revolution of 1917. He was active in the Oxford Hands Off Russia Committee and was instrumental in helping to organise the local CPGB unit.

1920s and Soviet experiences 
In 1920 as the dust was settling from the Russian Civil War, Fox travelled to Soviet Russia, an experience which further moved him towards lifelong identification with the communist political movement. Fox returned to Oxford, where in 1922 he graduated with a first class honours in modern languages. In the summer following graduation, Fox returned to Soviet Russia, this time as a worker with the Friends Relief Mission in Samara. Back in Great Britain, he went to work as a functionary for the CPGB in its propaganda department. He also studied in at the School of Foreign Languages and wrote his first major book, People of the Steppes, which was published in 1925. In 1925 Fox returned once again to Moscow, this time to work in the apparatus of the Communist International. He met his wife in the Soviet Union and married in the spring of 1926. In 1928 Fox went to work for the Sunday Worker, the high-profile weekly predecessor of the Daily Worker, launched in 1930. Fox and his wife returned once again to the Soviet Union in 1929, where he took a position as a librarian at the Marx-Engels Institute in Moscow.

1930s and Spanish Civil War

During his time with the Marx-Engels Institute, Fox began a detailed study of the Asiatic Mode of Production as reflected in the writings of Karl Marx. He published an article on the topic, "The Views of Marx and Engels on the Asiatic Mode of Production and Their Sources," in the journal Letopisi marksizma in 1930. Fox returned once again to England in 1932, going to work for the Daily Worker as a columnist and writing several pamphlets and books for the Communist press. In 1935 Fox shared a hotel room with the famous Jewish-American communist writer Mike Gold.

In 1936, to fight fascism in the Spanish Civil War, Fox joined the International Brigades through the French Communist Party in Paris.  When he arrived in Spain at the end of the year, he was sent to be trained in Albacete and was assigned to the XIV Brigade. After some weeks as a political commissar at the base, Fox was sent to the front in one of the first operations in which the Brigades were involved. Fox died at the Battle of Lopera in the province of Jaén in late December 1936. During the same fascist attack which killed Fox, his friend the Cambridge poet John Cornford was also killed. 

Some biographies state 3 January 1937 as his date of death, which was the day that his death was made public. However, modern historians place his death within late 1936.

Legacy
After Fox's death, the leader of the CPGB, Harry Pollitt, published a tribute to Fox's death, praising him for his convictions and contributions to the fight against fascism. 

In 1937 a selection of tributes to the memory of Fox was published and titled 'Ralph Fox: A Writer in Arms'. The bulletin of the Marx Memorial Library contains recent articles on Fox, and the Library holds many of Fox's papers and publications. To date there are only two extended accounts of Fox: Mike Freeman's 2009 study of Fox's life and cultural politics, 'Ralph Fox: Telling the Times' and a biographical essay by Don Hallett in the 2009 proceedings of the Halifax Antiquarian Society. Primary sources on Fox are available at the Working Class Movement Library at Salford, and Halifax Central Library.

A bench in his memorial sits at the Manor Heath Walled Garden, Halifax. Fox's memorial bench was erected by the Marxist historian EP Thompson.

Fox's name is included on the Oxford Spanish Civil War memorial.

Works
 People of the Steppes.  London: Constable, 1925.
 A Defence of Communism: In Reply to H.J. Laski. London: Communist Party of Great Britain, 1927.
 Storming Heaven.  London: Constable, 1928. —Novel
 The Colonial Policy of British Imperialism.  London: Martin Lawrence, 1933.
 Lenin.  London: Victor Gollancz, 1933.
 The Class Struggle in Britain. In Two Parts. New York: International Publishers, 1933.
 The Colonial Policy of British Imperialism. New York: International Publishers, 1934.
 Communism.  London: John Lane, 1935.
 Genghis Khan.  New York: Harcourt Brace and Company, 1936.
 France Faces the Future. New York: International Publishers, 1936.
 The Novel and the People.  London: Lawrence & Wishart, 1937. (posthumous)
 This Was Their Youth.  London: Secker & Warburg, 1937. (posthumous)
 Marx, Engels and Lenin on Ireland. New York: International Publishers, 1940. (posthumous)

See also 

 Thora Silverthorne
 Charlie Hutchison
 Bill Alexander (politician)
 GCT Giles

References

External links
 
 Ralph Fox Internet Archive, Marxists Internet Archive, www.marxists.org/
 Harry Pollitt, Ralph Fox: A Tribute, Marxists Internet Archive, www.marxists.org/

1900 births
1930s deaths
People from Halifax, West Yorkshire
Communist Party of Great Britain members
English male journalists
English communists
International Brigades personnel
British people of the Spanish Civil War
Military personnel killed in the Spanish Civil War
English anti-fascists
20th-century English historians
British Communist writers